Jayme Monjardim Matarazzo (São Paulo, São Paulo, May 19, 1956) is a Brazilian TV and film director. He is the only child of André Matarazzo Filho and Maysa Matarazzo.

He is the former husband of actress Ingra Liberato, divorced without issue. He has also been married to Fernanda Lauer, with whom he had two children (Maria Fernanda Matarazzo and Jayme Matarazzo Filho). With actress Daniela Escobar, whom he married in 1995 and divorced in 2003, he had a son named André Matarazzo (born in 1998). On March 10, 2007, Jayme Monjardim married singer Tânia Mara. In September 2010, Mara gave birth to their first child, a daughter, named after Monjardim's famous mother, Maysa.

His works as TV director include the telenovelas Pantanal, Terra Nostra, O Clone, América and Viver a Vida. He also directed the film Olga.

References

External links 
 

Article from Marie Claire magazine (in Portuguese)
Profile at Meu Cinema Brasileiro website (in Portuguese)

Brazilian film directors
Brazilian people of Italian descent
1956 births
Living people
People from São Paulo